Wirrinyga Band (also known as Warrinyga Band) are a rock band from Milingimbi, a small island in Arnhem Land, Northern Territory. The band members are Yolngu. They sing in both Language and English and they mix modern instruments with traditional.

Discography
 Dreamtime Shadow (1990) - CAAMA
 Dreamtime Wisdom, Modern Time Vision (1995) - CAAMA

References

Cultural Dissent, Green Left Weekly issue #290 17 September 1997 The sound of Arnhem Land, Dreamtime Wisdom Modern Time Vision review
Music Australia Dreamtime shadow
Music Australia Dreamtime wisdom modern time vision

Northern Territory musical groups
Indigenous Australian musical groups